The 1965 Belgian Grand Prix was a Formula One motor race held at Spa-Francorchamps on 13 June 1965. It was race 3 of 10 in both the 1965 World Championship of Drivers and the 1965 International Cup for Formula One Manufacturers. The race was won by British driver Jim Clark who led every lap of the race driving a Lotus 33. It was one of the Scot's most dominant wins. In the rain, he pulled away and with a third of the race to go, the Lotus driver was leading his fellow Scotsman Jackie Stewart by 1 minute and 20 seconds. However, for the last six laps Clark eased off dramatically and when the chequered flag was waved his lead was down to just under 45 seconds.

Classification

Qualifying

Race

Championship standings after the race

Drivers' Championship standings

Constructors' Championship standings

 Notes: Only the top five positions are included for both sets of standings.

References

Belgian Grand Prix
Belgian Grand Prix
European Grand Prix
Grand Prix
June 1965 sports events in Europe